Liriomyza is a genus of leaf miner flies in the family Agromyzidae. There are at least 410 described species in Liriomyza.

See also
 List of Liriomyza species

References

Further reading

External links

 

Agromyzidae
Articles created by Qbugbot
Opomyzoidea genera